Joseph Zong Huaide, may refer to:

 Joseph Zong Huaide (Shandong), Bishop of the Catholic Diocese of Zhoucun.
 Joseph Zong Huaide (Shaanxi), Bishop of the Catholic Diocese of Sanyuan.